Edward Lee Bodel (May 21, 1921 – May 17, 2008) was an American figure skater.  He competed in ice dance with Carmel Waterbury Bodel, and the pair was married in 1949.  The Bodels won the gold medal at the U.S. Figure Skating Championships three times and captured the bronze medal at the 1954 World Figure Skating Championships.

Competitive Highlights
(with Carmel)

Notes

1921 births
2008 deaths
American male ice dancers
World Figure Skating Championships medalists